Minor league baseball teams were based in Logansport, Indiana in various seasons between 1888 and 1911. Logansport teams played as members of the Indiana State League in 1888, 1890, 1896, 1900 and the Northern State of Indiana League in 1910 and 1911.

History
The 1888 Logansport Oilers first began minor league play as members of the Indiana State League and won a championship in a shortened season. Logansport began play on May 11, 1888, as members of the Independent six–team league with fellow members representing from Indiana cities of Elkhart, Fort Wayne, Frankfort, Lafayette, and Marion. After the season began, the Lafayette, Indiana franchise withdrew on June 12, 1888, to join the Central Interstate League and were replaced by the South Bend Green Stockings. The 1888 Indiana State League folded mid–season, on June 18, 1888. The Logansport Oilers were in 1st place with a 10–3 record when the Indiana State League stopped play in 1888.

The Indiana State League expanded and played as an eight–team league in 1890 and Logansport joined the league mid–season. The 1890 member teams to begin the season were Anderson, Bluffton, Elkhart, Fort Wayne Reds, Kokomo, Marion, Muncie and Peru. During the season, On July 6, 1890, Marion (27–24) transferred to Logansport. The team finished 29–29 overall to place 5th under manager Bob Berryhill.

The Logansport Ottos played as members of the 1896 six–team Independent level Indiana State League. The Ottos were the 1896 league champions with a 4–2 record under manager M.A Ryan. The league began play on July 26 and the season ended on August 4, 1896. The team was named after club owner Otto Kraus.

In the final season of play, the Indiana State League reformed as a six–team league for the 1900 season. Logansport moved to become the Elwood Wanderers during the season and the team then disbanded June 10. The team had a 7–17 record and were in 6th place under manager John Ray when the franchise folded. When the Logansport/Elwood and Muncie teams both disbanded on June 10, 1900, it caused the entire league to fold. The Wabash Farmers were in 1st place with a 19–9 record when the league disbanded.

In 1910, the Logansport Whitecaps became members of the Class D level Northern State of Indiana League. The league began the season with four teams. On July 2, 1910, the Bluffton and Marion franchises joined league play and games played prior to July 1, 1910, were not counted in the standings. The Wabash Rockeries won the league championship with a 46–25 record, finishing 3.5 games ahead of the 2nd place Bluffton Babes, while the Whitecaps placed 6th in the standings with a record of 24–45 under managers Nathanial Fleming, Thomas and Fred Payne.

The 1911 season was the final season of play for the Northern State of Indiana League and Logansport. During the final season, the Logansport Whitecaps franchise moved to Anderson, Indiana on July 2, 1911, and Bluffton folded on the same date. The league permanently folded on July 29, 1911. At the time the league folded, the Marion Boosters, with a record of 46–24, finished 6.0 games ahead of the 2nd place Huntington Indians in the six–team league. The Bluffton Babes (31–31), Wabash Rockeries (30–35), Lafayette Farmers (28–37) and Logansport /Anderson Whitecaps (22–40) were the remaining franchises in the last season of play. The Whitecaps were managed by John Reagan in their final season.

The Northern State of Indiana League permanently folded following the 1911 season. Logansport has not hosted another minor league team.

The ballpark
The name of the Logansport home minor league ballpark is not directly referenced. In the era, Spencer Park was in use as a public park, beginning in 1892.

Timeline

Year–by–year records

Notable alumni
Monte Beville (1896)
Bill Byers (1896)

See also
Logansport Ottos players

References

External links
Baseball Reference
Ottos team photo

Cass County, Indiana